Cima delle Pozzette is one of the highest summits of the Monte Baldo mountain range and thereby part of the Garda Mountains in northern Italy.

Morphology 
The Cima delle Pozzette summit is one of the highest peaks of the Monte Baldo range, that roughly extends from north to south. Other prominent peaks in the range are Punta Telegrafo and Cima Valdritta to the south.

Climbing 
The summit can be reached from the south via Punta Telegrafo passing Cima Valdritta as a long hike over the Monte Baldo mountain ridge, or easiest from north from the summit station of the cable car from Malcesine.

External links

Mountains of the Alps
Mountains of Veneto
Mountains of Trentino
Garda Mountains
Two-thousanders of Italy